Viviani Emerick (born 9 September 1976) is a Brazilian handball player. She competed in the women's tournament at the 2000 Summer Olympics.

References

1976 births
Living people
Brazilian female handball players
Olympic handball players of Brazil
Handball players at the 2000 Summer Olympics
Sportspeople from Niterói